Raden Ajeng Titien Sumarni (28 December 1935 – 13 May 1966) was an Indonesian actress active in the 1950s. Born in Surabaya, she moved to Tasikmalaya as a child and developed an interest in stage acting, trained by her uncle and future husband Mustari, later acting for republican troops during the Indonesian National Revolution. Sumarni began acting in film in 1951, making her debut with Seruni Laju. Over her five-year career Sumarni acted in thirty films, established her own film production company, and became one of the most popular Indonesian actresses of her time. Following her final film, Djandjiku (1956), Sumarni fell out of the spotlight, eventually dying at very young age.

Biography
Sumarni was born on 28 December 1935 in Surabaya, Dutch East Indies. She was of mixed Javanese–Sundanese descent. Her father, an assistant wedana in Surabaya, died when she was three, and when Sumarni was aged six she moved to her mother's town in Tasikmalaya.

While in junior high school in Bandung, at age fifteen, Sumarni began studying acting under her uncle R. Mustari, who was 16 years her senior. He later became her husband; according to the author Rd. Lingga Wisjnu, this was taken as revenge against her lover, an Indonesian military officer who cheated on her with Mustari's wife. After marriage, Sumarni dropped out of school and began a career as a stage actress, entertaining troops fighting in the Indonesian National Revolution until she moved with her husband to Jakarta.

Sumarni became interested in the Indonesian film industry in 1950, after seeing Nana Mayo in Inspektur Rachman. With her husband's permission, she entered the industry in 1951 through an acquaintance, Harun Al-Rasyid, who was an employee at the Golden Arrow Film Company. Al-Rasyid in turn introduced her to Rd Ariffien, a director. Sumarni soon made her feature film debut in Golden Arrow's Seruni Laju; this was followed by a role in Kino Drama Atelier's Gadis Olahraga (1951), though as the films' production schedules coincided Sumarni had contract difficulties.

After the death of Dr. Huyung, the manager and director for Kino Drama Atelier, Sumarni was contracted to Djamaluddin Malik's Persari, but migrated to Fred Young's Bintang Surabaja after she promoted cigarettes during an exhibition. There would subsequently be rumors into 1955 that her relations with Persari were stressed, though she later made peace with Malik. Sumarni's first production with Bintang Surabaja, Putri Solo (1953), was a major commercial success, breaking box-office records throughout the country. Sumarni's fan mail increased from 20 to 30 letters a day to several hundred. Sometime after she gained this popularity, she divorced Mustari and married Laurens Saerang, a rich entrepreneur from North Sulawesi.

By 1954, Sumarni was one of the most popular Indonesian actresses. She was widely recognized by the mole over her lip and was considered one of Indonesia's most beautiful actresses. Dunia Film described her as the Marilyn Monroe of Indonesia. Reportedly President Sukarno's favorite actress, Sumarni was deemed the "Queen of the Silver Screen" after a survey conducted by several magazines, including Kentjana and Dunia Film, in 1954.

Sumarni established her own film company, Titien Sumarni Motion Pictures, in 1954. Rather than build her own studios, Sumarni used those of Usmar Ismail's Perfini, paying nothing; the company considered its renting of the facilities to be repayment of debts they had incurred from Mustari during the production of Krisis (1953). Titien Sumarni Motion Pictures produced five films. The first, Putri dari Medan, starred Sumarni as the titular woman from Medan. After having her first child, a son named Sjarif Tommy who later became a singer under nickname Tommy Soemarni & Co, Sumarni took a hiatus from acting. Her company, however, produced two films during this time: Mertua Sinting and Tengah Malam. Two final films, Sampah and Saidjah Putri Pantai, followed in 1955 and 1956; Sumarni again took the lead roles.

Sumarni made her last film, Djandjiku, in 1956. She died at Bandung Advent Hospital in Coblong, Bandung, on 13 May 1966. The Indonesian entertainment news website KapanLagi.com reports that, at the time, she was living alone with her children, had lost a considerable amount of weight, and was suffering from a lung infection.

Filmography
During her five-year career, Sumarni acted in thirty films. She was also sound manager on one film and, through her company Titien Sumarni Motion Pictures, producer of five.

Cast

 Gadis Olahraga (1951)
 Kenangan Masa (1951)
 Main-Main Djadi Sungguhan (1951)
 Dunia Gila (1951)
 Sepandjang Malioboro (1951)
 Seruni Laju (1951)
 Apa Salahku (1952)
 Pahit-Pahit Manis (1952)
 Pengorbanan (1952)
 Terkabul (1952)
 Satria Desa (1952)
 Si Mientje (1952)
 Ajah Kikir (1953)
 Asam Digunung Garam Dilaut (1953)
 Gara-gara Hadiah (1953)
 Putri Solo (1953)
 Lagu Kenangan (1953)
 Dewi dan Pemilihan Umum (1954)
 Antara Tugas dan Tjinta (1954)
 Kasih Sajang (1954)
 Klenting Kuning (1954)
 Konde Tjioda (1954)
 Lewat Djam Malam (1954)
 Perkasa Alam (1954)
 Putri dari Medan (1954)
 Sedarah Sedaging (1954)
 Senjum Derita (1955)
 Sampah (1955)
 Saidjah Putri Pantai (1956)
 Djandjiku (1956)

Crew

 Putri dari Medan (1954)
 Mertua Sinting (1954)
 Tengah Malam (1955)
 Putri Solo Kembali (1956)
 Sampah (1956)
 Saidjah Putri Pantai (1956)

References

Works cited

External links

1935 births
1966 deaths
Indonesian film actresses
Indonesian film producers
People from Surabaya